Matters of the Heart is a 1973 Soviet drama film directed by Azhdar Ibragimov.

Plot 
The film tells about sudden illnesses and the people who treat them.

Cast 
 Antonina Shuranova as Lida
 Ekaterina Markova as Natasha
 Anatoliy Papanov as Boris Ivanovich
 Georgiy Taratorkin as Yevgeni Pavlovich
 Pavel Vinnik
 Inna Kondrateva		
 Georgiy Kulikov
 Dmitriy Masanov
 Daniil Netrebin
 Lidiya Dranovskaya

References

External links 
 

1973 films
1970s Russian-language films
Soviet drama films
1973 drama films